Joseph Eric Thornton (born July 2, 1979) is a Canadian professional ice hockey centre who is currently an unrestricted free agent. He has previously played for the Boston Bruins, San Jose Sharks, Toronto Maple Leafs and Florida Panthers of the National Hockey League (NHL). He was selected first overall by the Bruins in the 1997 NHL Entry Draft and went on to play seven seasons with the club, three as its captain. During the 2005–06 season, he was traded to the Sharks. Splitting the campaign between the two teams, he received the Art Ross and Hart Memorial Trophy as the league's leading point-scorer and most valuable player, respectively. Thornton would go on to another 14 seasons with the Sharks, including four seasons as team captain and a run to the 2016 Stanley Cup Finals.

Thornton's on-ice vision, strength on the puck, deft passing ability and power forward style of play led to him becoming one of the league's premier centres. He is widely regarded as one of the best passers of all time, and he is one of only seven players in history with 1,100 NHL assists. His nickname "Jumbo Joe" is a nod to his large stature and to Jumbo the elephant, who died in St. Thomas, Ontario, where Thornton was raised.

Thornton was the last active player in any of the major North American professional sports leagues to have played in the 1990s, and the last active NHL player to have played in an NHL game against Wayne Gretzky.

Playing career

Amateur career
Thornton grew up playing minor hockey in his hometown of St. Thomas, Ontario, for the St. Thomas Travellers. He played "AA" hockey for the Travelers and in peewee won an Ontario Minor Hockey Association (OMHA) championship in 1992–93. His Bantam year was the first for the newly created "AAA" Elgin-Middlesex Chiefs organization, and Thornton joined the "AAA" Elgin-Middlesex Chiefs of the Minor Hockey Alliance of Ontario for the 1993–94 season. The creation of this organization led to the St. Thomas Minor Hockey Association to compete at the "A" level. During his bantam year, he appeared in six games for the Junior B St. Thomas Stars of the Ontario Hockey Association (OHA), scoring eight points in six games as a 14-year-old. The following season, Thornton joined the Stars full-time and reeled off 104 points over 50 games as a 15-year-old, and was subsequently drafted second overall in the 1995 OHL Draft to the Sault Ste. Marie Greyhounds behind Daniel Tkaczuk, who was selected by the Barrie Colts.

Beginning in 1995–96, Thornton began a two-year career in the Ontario Hockey League (OHL) with the Greyhounds. He posted a 76-point season in his first year, earning both OHL and CHL Rookie of the Year honours. The following season, Thornton improved to 41 goals and 122 points, second overall in League scoring behind Marc Savard of the Oshawa Generals, and was named to the OHL second All-Star team.

Boston Bruins (1997–2005)
After his second OHL season, Thornton was selected first overall in the 1997 NHL Entry Draft by the Boston Bruins. Thornton suffered a fractured arm in the Bruins' pre-season but made their roster for the 1997–98 campaign. He scored his first career NHL goal on December 3, 1997, in a 3–0 win against the Philadelphia Flyers. Bruins head coach Pat Burns was measured in his deployment of Thornton, using him almost exclusively on the fourth line and making him a regular healthy scratch. Averaging eight minutes and five seconds of ice time per game over the course of the season, he registered three goals and seven points in 55 games as a rookie. In the 1998 Stanley Cup playoffs, Thornton went scoreless in six games.

In 1998–99, Thornton saw significantly more ice time, averaging 15 minutes and 20 seconds per game, and improved to 41 points in 81 games, as well as a 9-point effort in 11 playoff games.

Thornton continued to build into a key player in the Bruins' line-up, increasing his points total in each of the following two campaigns. Prior to the 2002–03 season, he was named team captain, succeeding Jason Allison, who was traded to the Los Angeles Kings in 2001; the captaincy position was vacant for a full season after Allison's departure. In his first season as team captain, Thornton recorded 68 points over 66 games. The following year, he notched his first career 100-point season with 36 goals, a career-high, and 65 assists. He ranked third in NHL point-scoring, behind Peter Forsberg of the Colorado Avalanche and Markus Näslund from the Vancouver Canucks.

Thornton's production declined to 73 points in 77 games in the 2003–04 campaign. He suffered a fractured right cheekbone in a fight with New York Rangers centre Eric Lindros during a game on January 19, 2004. The two power forwards fought after Lindros cross-checked Thornton in the head. The injury required surgery, keeping him out of the line-up for three games. The 2003–04 campaign also saw a drop in Thornton's goal-scoring production that has never since rebounded; his last 30-goal season came during the 2002–03 season.

During the 2004–05 NHL lock-out, Thornton went abroad to play for HC Davos of the Swiss National League A (NLA). He played on a line with fellow NHL players Rick Nash and Niklas Hagman, helping HC Davos to win the League championship and the Spengler Cup. Nash and Thornton have subsequently kept in contact with HC Davos and their longtime coach Arno del Curto; Thornton returns to train with the club for up to a month each summer.

Trade to San Jose
Ahead of the NHL resumption in 2005–06, Thornton became a restricted free agent in summer 2005. Negotiations on a new contract were strained: Thornton was reportedly unhappy with the direction of the Bruins franchise, and upset with criticism of his play in the Bruins' early playoff exit in 2004. Boston's front office was apparently unhappy with Thornton's leadership style and for not raising his level of play during the playoffs. Nevertheless, Thornton re-signed with Boston on August 11, 2005, to a three-year, $20 million contract.

Thornton began the 2005–06 season strongly (33 points in 24 games), making him the team's leading scorer by a substantial margin, but the Bruins were struggling in the standings. On November 30, 2005, he was traded to the San Jose Sharks in a four-player deal, which sent forwards Marco Sturm and Wayne Primeau and defenceman Brad Stuart to Boston in exchange for Thornton. Mike O'Connell, the Bruins general manager who traded Thornton, stated in June 2011 that he "would still make the trade", and that it was "satisfying" that Boston had won a Stanley Cup before Thornton's new team had. O'Connell questioned Thornton's character both on- and off-ice at the time, contrasting him with Patrice Bergeron, who was playing his second full season with the Bruins when the trade took place. O'Connell recalled making a decision with assistant general manager Jeff Gorton to build the team around Bergeron instead of Thornton. Despite O'Connell's stance, the trade is widely considered to be one of the most-lopsided deals in NHL history.

San Jose Sharks (2005–2020)
Upon arriving in San Jose, Thornton improved the Sharks' fortunes and found instant chemistry with winger Jonathan Cheechoo. During the absence of usual alternate captain Alyn McCauley from the San Jose line-up, Thornton donned the "A" for the first time as a Shark in a game against the Phoenix Coyotes on March 30, 2006, and wore the "A" whenever McCauley was out of the line-up for the remainder of the season. Tallying 92 points in 58 games with the Sharks after the trade, Thornton finished the season with a league-leading 96 assists and 125 points total to earn the Art Ross Trophy as the league's top scorer. He became the first player to win the award while splitting the season between two teams. Due to Thornton's success, Cheechoo also enjoyed a career-season, winning the Rocket Richard Trophy as the NHL's top goal-scorer with 56 goals. However, in the 2006 playoffs, Thornton was once again criticized for his play, as his production decreased to 2 goals and 9 points in 11 games as the Sharks were ousted in the second round. In the off-season, Thornton was honoured for his regular season play and was awarded the Hart Memorial Trophy as the league' regular season MVP to go with his Art Ross Trophy. He is the only player in NHL history to win the Hart Trophy while playing for two different teams in the same season.

Thornton began the 2006–07 season being awarded a permanent alternate captaincy, but struggled in the first half of the season while suffering from a toe injury that did not heal until January 2007. After recovering, Thornton enjoyed a productive second half, battling Pittsburgh Penguins Sidney Crosby for a second-consecutive scoring title late in the year, eventually finishing six points behind Crosby with 114. With a league-leading 92 assists, Thornton became only the third player in NHL history to record back-to-back 90-assist seasons, joining Wayne Gretzky and Mario Lemieux.

Thornton began the 2007 playoffs by recording six assists in the Sharks' first-round series against the Nashville Predators. Advancing to the second round against the Detroit Red Wings, he recorded a goal and three assists in the first three games of the series. However, Thornton was effectively neutralized by Red Wings defenceman Nicklas Lidström, for the remainder of the series as the Sharks were eliminated in six games.

In the off-season, Thornton signed a three-year contract extension worth US$21.6 million that kept him with the Sharks until June 2011. In the 2007–08 season, Thornton finished with 96 points (29 goals and 67 assists) to finish fifth in NHL scoring. In 2008–09, Thornton was named captain of the Western Conference for the 2009 NHL All-Star Game in Montreal. He completed the season with 86 points. In the subsequent playoffs, he recorded a goal and four assists in six games as the Sharks were eliminated in the first round by the Anaheim Ducks.

In September 2009, before the start of the 2009–10 season, the Sharks acquired Dany Heatley in a three-player trade that sent Thornton's struggling former linemate Jonathan Cheechoo, left-winger Milan Michálek and a second-round draft pick to the Ottawa Senators. Thornton, Heatley, and Sharks captain Patrick Marleau were joined on the Sharks' top line and enjoyed immediate offensive success together. The trio helped the Sharks to one of their best-ever regular seasons in franchise history. Although the line's production slowed down in the second half of the season, all three Sharks players finished in the League's top 15 in point-scoring. Thornton's 89 points ranked eighth, while Marleau and Heatley finished 14th and 15th in League scoring with 83 and 82 points, respectively. The Sharks entered the 2010 playoffs as the first seed in the Western Conference for the second-consecutive year. After advancing past the Colorado Avalanche and Detroit Red Wings in the first two rounds, the Sharks were eliminated by the Chicago Blackhawks in the Western Conference Finals. Thornton finished the playoffs with a career-high 12 points in 15 games.

After the elimination, team management vacated all the Sharks' captaincy positions, including Thornton's role as one of the alternate captains. Prior to the 2010–11 season, he was chosen to replace the retiring Rob Blake as the eighth captain in team history on October 7, 2010. Nine days later, he signed a three-year, US$21 million contract extension with the Sharks. Near the start of the 2010–11 season, Thornton scored the fourth hat-trick of his NHL career against Martin Brodeur in a 5–2 win over the New Jersey Devils. In November 2010, Thornton was suspended two games for a controversial hit to the head against St. Louis Blues forward David Perron. Perron missed the remaining 72 games of the 2010–11 season due to post-concussion syndrome. He returned after missing 97 games over 13 months (394 days) on December 3, 2011. Later in the campaign, Thornton eclipsed Marleau as the Sharks' all-time leader in assists. Thornton scored his 1,000th career point with a goal in a game against the Phoenix Coyotes on April 8, 2011. In the first round of the 2011 playoffs, Thornton scored the series-winning goal in overtime of Game 6 against the Los Angeles Kings to advance the Sharks to the second round.

On January 24, 2014, Thornton signed a three-year contract extension with the Sharks through to the 2017 season.

At the end of the 2013–14 season, Thornton ranked 46th on the all-time points leaders (1,194) and 24th on the all-time assist leaders (852) for the NHL. He also became the San Jose Sharks' all-time leader in assists with 567. Thornton finished the 2013–14 season with 11 goals and 65 assists as the Sharks amassed 111 points, just six short of their franchise's all-time-high mark, and were among the favourites to win the Stanley Cup. Facing their in-state rival Los Angeles Kings in the first round of the 2014 playoffs, the Sharks won the first three games in the best-of-seven series. However, Los Angeles won the next four games and became just the fourth team in NHL history to win a playoff series after trailing three games to none. Thornton finished the playoffs with just two goals and an assist.

On August 20, 2014, Sharks head coach Todd McLellan announced that Thornton had been stripped of his captaincy and that the Sharks would start the 2014–15 season without a captain. Joe Pavelski was eventually named Sharks' captain at the start of the 2015–16 season.

On January 26, 2015, Thornton recorded his 1,300th career point during a game against the Colorado Avalanche with his assist on a Joe Pavelski goal, Thornton's second assist of the game. Thornton is the 33rd player in NHL history to reach 1,300 points, second among active players (Jaromír Jágr being first). Thornton recorded 16 goals and 49 assists during the 2014–15 season as the Sharks failed to qualify for the Stanley Cup playoffs for the first time since 2003.

Thornton finished the 2015–16 season with 19 goals and 63 assists as the Sharks returned to the playoffs after a one-year slump. In the 2016 playoffs, the Sharks beat the Kings in the first round in five games, avenging a previous loss to them two years earlier. In the second round, they defeated the Nashville Predators in seven games and advanced to the Conference Finals for the first time since 2011, where the Sharks defeated the St. Louis Blues in six games to advance to the Stanley Cup Finals for the first time in franchise history. This was also Thornton's first time playing in the Finals in his career. However, the Sharks lost to the Pittsburgh Penguins in six games in the Finals. Thornton finished fifth in playoff points with 21 and second in playoff assists with 18. At the end of the season, Thornton was named a Second-Team All-Star for the 2015–16 season.

On March 6, 2017, in a game against the Winnipeg Jets, Thornton recorded his 1,000th NHL assist, becoming the 13th player in NHL history to reach the milestone. Since Thornton started playing in the NHL in 1997, he has had the most assists among the league's active players.

On July 1, 2017, Thornton signed a one-year contract to return to the Sharks for the 2017–18 season. In January 2018, Thornton injured his ACL and MCL and missed the remainder of the season recovering from surgery.

On July 2, 2018, Thornton signed a one-year contract to return to the Sharks for the 2018–19 season. On November 13, 2018, he scored his 400th career goal to go along with 1,500 games played and 1,000 assists. , this feat has only been achieved by six other players in NHL history. On February 11, 2019, in a 7–2 win over the Vancouver Canucks, Thornton passed Gordie Howe for ninth place on the NHL all-time assists list. Thornton and the Sharks would reach the Western Conference Finals, though they were knocked out by the eventual Stanley Cup champion St. Louis Blues in six games. Thornton put up four goals and six assists during the playoffs.

He re-signed to a one-year, $2 million contract on September 6, 2019 to remain with the Sharks. He recorded his 1,500th career point on February 4, 2020, in a 3–1 win over the Calgary Flames. The Sharks posted a disappointing record this season, and did not make the post-season. Thornton expressed dissatisfaction with not being traded to a playoff team after the February 24 trade deadline to give him the opportunity to win his first Stanley Cup, as had happened with longtime teammate Marleau.

Toronto Maple Leafs (2020–2021)
With the 2020–21 NHL season delayed due to the ongoing COVID-19 pandemic, Thornton returned to HC Davos of the National League on October 15, 2020, for a third stint. Having held Swiss citizenship since 2019, he did not count against the import limit.

On October 16, 2020, Thornton signed a one-year, $700,000 contract with the Toronto Maple Leafs. On December 14, 2020, Thornton left Davos to return to Toronto for the start of training camp. On January 16, 2021, Thornton scored his first goal as a Maple Leaf. On January 22, 2021, Thornton suffered a fractured rib injury after getting hit by Edmonton Oilers forward Josh Archibald. Thornton returned to the lineup on February 27, recording 20 points in 44 games. Thornton scored one goal in the Maple Leafs seven-game series loss to the Montreal Canadiens in the first round of the 2021 Stanley Cup playoffs.

Florida Panthers (2021–2022)
On August 13, 2021, Thornton returned for his 24th NHL season, signing a one-year, $750,000 contract with the Florida Panthers.

International play

Thornton was named to Canada's national under-20 team for the 1997 World Junior Championships in Switzerland. At 17 years old, he recorded four points in seven games, helping Canada to a gold medal. Two years later, he made his debut with the Canadian men's team at the 2001 World Championships in Germany. Thornton collected a goal and an assist over six games, as Canada was eliminated in the quarter-finals by the United States.

Thornton's next international appearance occurred at the 2004 World Cup. Established by then as a premier player in the NHL, Thornton tied for third in tournament scoring with six points (a goal and five assists) over six games. He notched two assists in the championship game against Finland, helping Canada to a 3–2 win. At the 2005 IIHF World Championship in Austria, Thornton led all scorers with 16 points (six goals and ten assists) in nine games and was named tournament MVP. Canada advanced to the gold medal game, where they were shut-out 3–0 by the Czech Republic.

Thornton made his first appearance in the 2006 Winter Olympics. He recorded three points as Canada was shut out in three of six games, losing to Russia in the quarterfinals. Four years later, he was again chosen to Canada's Olympic team for the 2010 Winter Games in Vancouver. Thornton was joined by his Sharks linemates Dany Heatley and Patrick Marleau, as well as Sharks defenceman Dan Boyle, on the squad. The offensive trio of Sharks played on the same line in the Olympics, as well. Thornton registered a goal and an assist over seven games, helping Canada to a gold medal finish.

Thornton was later invited to the Canada's hockey camp for the 2014 Winter Olympics, but did not attend due to his son being hospitalized with an illness. He was named to the Canadian roster for the 2016 World Cup of Hockey held in Toronto.

Personal life
Thornton is married to Tabea Pfendsack, whom he met while playing in Switzerland during the 2004–05 NHL lockout. The couple has a daughter and a son. Born in St. Thomas, Ontario, Thornton became a naturalized American citizen in July 2009 at a ceremony in Campbell, California, a suburb of San Jose; he later also received a Swiss passport. Joe and former Sharks teammate Scott Thornton are first cousins.

In popular culture
The Tragically Hip lead vocalist Gord Downie's song "You Me and the B's" (from his 2017 solo album Introduce Yerself) includes a lament about Thornton's poorly-received trade from the Bruins to the Sharks in 2005.

Career statistics

Regular season and playoffs
Bold indicates led league

International

Awards

Major junior
 Named to the OHL All-Rookie Team in 1996.
 Won the Emms Family Award as OHL rookie of the year in 1996.
 Named the CHL Rookie of the Year in 1996.
 Named to the OHL second All-Star team in 1997.

NHL
 Played in the National Hockey League All-Star Game in 2002, 2003, 2004, 2007, 2008 and 2009 (captain).
 Won the Art Ross Trophy in 2006.
 Won the Hart Memorial Trophy in 2006.
 Named to the NHL first All-Star team in 2006.
 Named to the NHL second All-Star team in 2003, 2008 and 2016.

SUI
 Won the Spengler Cup with HC Davos in 2004.
 Won the Swiss ice hockey championship with HC Davos in 2005.

International
 Won the World Junior Championships gold medal with Team Canada in 1997.
 Won the World Cup of Hockey with Team Canada in 2004.
 Won the 2010 Winter Olympics gold medal with Canada.
 Won the World Cup of Hockey with Team Canada in 2016.

Records
 Only player in NHL history to win the Art Ross Trophy and Hart Memorial Trophy while switching teams in his winning campaign – 2005–06.
 Highest point total recorded by a player while playing with two different teams in one season – 125 (2005–06)
 Third player in NHL history to record back-to-back 90 assist seasons, with 92 in 2006–07 and 96 in 2005–06 (combined Boston/San Jose). The other two to accomplish this feat are Wayne Gretzky and Mario Lemieux.
 Most games played by the first overall selection in the NHL Entry draft, currently 1714.
 San Jose Sharks' all-time leader in assists – 745
 San Jose Sharks' all-time leader in +/- with +172
 San Jose Sharks' all-time leader in points per game with 1.01

See also
 Power forward (ice hockey)
 List of NHL players with 1,000 points
 List of NHL players with 1,000 assists
 List of NHL players with 1,000 games played

References

External links
 
 
 
 
 
 
 

1979 births
Living people
Art Ross Trophy winners
Boston Bruins captains
Boston Bruins draft picks
Boston Bruins players
Canadian emigrants to the United States
Canadian expatriate ice hockey players in Switzerland
Canadian expatriate ice hockey players in the United States
Canadian ice hockey centres
Florida Panthers players
Hart Memorial Trophy winners
HC Davos players
Ice hockey people from Ontario
Ice hockey players at the 2006 Winter Olympics
Ice hockey players at the 2010 Winter Olympics
Medalists at the 2010 Winter Olympics
National Hockey League All-Stars
National Hockey League first-overall draft picks
National Hockey League first-round draft picks
Olympic gold medalists for Canada
Olympic ice hockey players of Canada
Olympic medalists in ice hockey
People from St. Thomas, Ontario
San Jose Sharks players
Sault Ste. Marie Greyhounds players
Sportspeople from London, Ontario
Toronto Maple Leafs players